Loring is an unincorporated community in Phillips County, Montana, United States. Loring has a post office serving ZIP code 59537, a bar and grill, a vehicle repair shop, a church and homes.

Loring began as a stop on the Great Northern Railway’s branch line between Saco and Hogeland. The post office opened in 1929.

Climate
According to the Köppen Climate Classification system, Loring has a semi-arid climate, abbreviated "BSk" on climate maps.

References

Unincorporated communities in Phillips County, Montana
Unincorporated communities in Montana